Arjai, previously credited as Prinz Nithik is an Indian actor, who has appeared in Tamil language films. He has appeared as the antagonist in films including Naan Sigappu Manithan (2014) and Massu Engira Masilamani (2015).

Career
While pursuing his profession as a graphic designer, Prinz Nithik trained under stunt choreographer Pandiyan, and sought to make a career as an actor. Prinz became acquainted with actor Vishal after meeting him at a film function, and the actor had revealed that Prinz would have been an ideal for a villainous role in Pandiya Naadu, but the team had already chosen another actor. Vishal agreed to work with Prinz at a later date, while director Shakti Rajan chose to introduce him as the antagonist in another film Naaigal Jaakirathai (2014), for which he worked closely with a Belgian Shepherd. Vishal later signed him on to appear in Naan Sigappu Manithan  (2014), in which he played a similar negative role. Both films won positive reviews and performed well at the box office. In 2015, he portrayed a supporting antagonist in Venkat Prabhu's Massu Engira Masilamani (2015).

Filmography

Web series

References

External links

Living people
Male actors in Tamil cinema
21st-century Indian male actors
Indian graphic designers
1981 births